Christ the King College is a boys-only Catholic school located in Jhansi, Uttar Pradesh, India. The school is  affiliated with the Indian Certificate of Secondary Education (ICSE / ISC).

College history

Christ the King College was started in 1940 in the Civil Lines by the first bishop of Jhansi, Bishop Francis Xavier Fenech from Malta, Europe. The first principal was Br. Leo (OFM, CAP) from Mahim, Bombay. He remained as principal for 18 years in C.K.C.

In 1940, the school was shifted to the present St. Joseph’s School in the cantonment area. The first headmaster of C.K.C. was Mr. Eric D'Souza. Initially, the school was recognised by Senior Cambridge, but the students also had the option of appearing for the Uttar Pradesh State Board. The recognition of the ICSE/ISC Board was obtained in 1975 by Fr. Tony Late. The first batch of ICSE (X) was passed out in December 1976. In 1977, the academic year was changed from January-December to April-March, and therefore, the first batch of ISC (XII) passed out in March 1979. Fr. Augustine took over, and during his tenure, the school touched its zenith, with many students being selected in IITs, PMTs, Olympiads, the NDA, and various exams at the national, state, and regional level. Due to the increasing number of students, the school did not get permission to expand in the cantonment area, and the primary section was constructed and shifted to civil lines in 1978.

Alumni

Its Alumni are called CKCians, and sometimes they are unofficially called Old Collegians.

National Cadet Corps

The motto of NCC is 'Unity & Discipline' which was adopted on 23 Dec 1957. In living up to its motto, the NCC strives to be and is one of the greatest cohesive forces of the nation, bringing together the youth hailing from different parts of the country and molding them into united, secular and disciplined citizens of the nation. NCC training in college is also regular with proper dress code. College organizes regular camps for the NCC cadets and also certifies with A grade certificates for those who joined NCC and regular for training and camps.

Principals of Christ the King College

The following are the Rev. Fathers who have served as principals of the Christ the King College:-

References

External links
School's Alumni website
School's Official website
School's Ecare Login

Boys' schools in India
Catholic schools in India
Primary schools in Uttar Pradesh
High schools and secondary schools in Uttar Pradesh
Christian schools in Uttar Pradesh
Education in Jhansi
Educational institutions established in 1940
1940 establishments in India